"Hello Twelve, Hello Thirteen, Hello Love" is a song from the musical A Chorus Line.

Production
This song, just like all others in the musical A Chorus Line, was devised from the audio of real life dancers, recounting their experiences.

Synopsis
The official website of Marvin Hamlisch explains that in this song, "The conversation turns to sex, puberty. All reminisce about their circumstances growing up".

Composition
Talkin' Broadway wrote "The musical is still innovative in the way it melds song, dance and dialogue into a single piece of art: 'Hello Twelve, Hello Thirteen, Hello Love' envelops the audience as it incorporates full songs, brief melodies, and single spoken lines with almost constant movement."

Analysis
Musicals 101 analyses this song:

Critical reception
New City Stage wrote "The brilliance of 'A Chorus Line' has always been in the undeniable synergy of all its creative elements. Case in point:  the show’s fifteen-minute 'Hello Twelve, Hello Thirteen, Hello Love' number, better known as the 'Montage' since it actually consists of musical numbers within numbers, monologues, lyrical fragments and all-out dance sequences." The LA Times describes the number as "dazzling". Hi-Def Digest wrote "arguably the show's most exuberant song, 'Hello Twelve, Hello Thirteen, Hello Love,' [is] a clever, catchy celebration of adolescent agony". Florida Theatre On Stage wrote "Another memorable stretch was the extended fever dream of internal monologues about adolescence 'Hello Twelve, Hello Thirteen, Hello Love.' Besides the perfect staging and performances, it highlighted the fluid lighting design by Paul Black (including considerable backlighting) and split-second calls of stage managers Brandy Demil and Michael J. Iannelli." The New York Times wrote "Driven by the rush of Mr. Bennett’s dynamic choreography, the mesh of story and songs is wonderfully seamless, especially in extended montages like the frenetic opening, 'I Hope I Get It,' and 'Hello Twelve, Hello Thirteen, Hello Love,' a complex salute to the million and one pains of growing up." RecordOnline wrote "Most impressive might have been the wondrous 'Montage Part 1: Hello Twelve, Hello Thirteen, Hello Love.' The ensemble packed great energy into this number, which sheds the innocence from the stage and turns the dancers into professionals."

References

Songs about teenagers
Songs from A Chorus Line
1975 songs
LGBT-related songs